Unió Esportiva Tona is a Spanish football team based in Tona, in Catalonia.

History
The team was founded in 1956, however, until 1972 it began to participate in football leagues, when it was registered in Segunda Regional, a category that at that time was the sixth level in the Spanish football pyramid. During most of its history it remained in regional leagues.

In 2022 the team achieved promotion to Tercera Federación, the fifth category of Spanish football and the last at the professional level, this after being champion of their group in the Primera Catalana.

Season to season

1 season in Tercera Federación

Current squad

References

External links
Official website 
Futbolme team profile 

Football clubs in Catalonia
Association football clubs established in 1956
1956 establishments in Spain